Army@Love is an American comic book series from DC Comics' Vertigo imprint, which started in May 2007. It is drawn and scripted by Rick Veitch, with Gary Erskine on inking duties. Issue #12 published in February 2008 was the "season finale". A second series of 6 issues, titled Army@Love: The Art of War began monthly publication in August 2008.

The story follows the adventures of a unit of New Jersey National Guard in "Afbaghistan", a fictional Middle Eastern country.

As is often the case with Vertigo Comics, the title is designed to evoke memories of a long-running defunct DC title, in this case, Our Army at War, which, subsequent to its retitling to Sgt. Rock in 1977, was followed by a one-shot titled simply Army at War in 1978.

Plot
The unit includes both men and women, a great deal of the action following the amorous adventures of various members. The contrast between the surreal combat in Afbaghistan and the comfortable lives of the rear echelon and the people the Guardsmen have left behind is also a recurring theme.

Collected editions
The series is being collected as trade paperbacks:
 The Hot Zone Club (tpb, collects #1–5, 128 pages, October 2007)
 Generation Pwned (tpb, collects #6–12, 168 pages, July 2008)

References

External links
Make Love AND War, an article on Rick Veitch's Love@War, by Karen Green, a Columbia University librarian, writing for comiXology
CCI, Day 2: Rick Veitch is a One-Man "Army@Love", Comic Book Resources, July 21, 2006
Reviews of issue #1, Comics Bulletin
Review of The Hot Zone Club, Comics Bulletin

2007 comics debuts
2008 comics endings
Vertigo Comics titles
War comics